General Alvear Department may refer to

General Alvear Department, Corrientes, Argentina
General Alvear Department, Mendoza, Argentina
General Alvear Partido, Buenos Aires (though in the Buenos Aires Province departments are called partidos

See also
General Alvear (disambiguation)

Department name disambiguation pages